E84 may refer to:
 European route E84, a road
 King's Indian Defence, Sämisch Variation, Panno Main line, Encyclopaedia of Chess Openings code
 Shin-Shōnan Bypass and Seishō Bypass, route E84 in Japan